Nicrophorus kieticus is a burying beetle described by M. Mroczkowski in 1959. It is endemic to Bougainville Island, in the Papua New Guinean part of the Solomon Islands archipelago.

References

Silphidae
Beetles of Papua New Guinea
Endemic fauna of Papua New Guinea
Beetles described in 1959